Hector Llatser (born 10 November 1957 in Toulouse) is a French former sprinter who competed in the 1976 Summer Olympics and in the 1984 Summer Olympics.

References

1957 births
Living people
Sportspeople from Toulouse
Olympic athletes of France
Athletes (track and field) at the 1976 Summer Olympics
Athletes (track and field) at the 1984 Summer Olympics
Mediterranean Games gold medalists for France
Mediterranean Games silver medalists for France
Athletes (track and field) at the 1983 Mediterranean Games
Mediterranean Games medalists in athletics
French male sprinters
Universiade medalists in athletics (track and field)
Universiade bronze medalists for France